Jangah or Jang Gah may refer to:
 Jangah, Kerman
 Jang Gah, Khuzestan
 Jangah, North Khorasan
 Jangah, Razavi Khorasan